Aurora Productions may refer to:

Aurora Productions, Hollywood
Aurora Film Corporation in Kolkata, India
Aurora Productions, a media arm of Family International